Lovi may refer to:

 George Lovi (1939–1993), Hungarian-American astronomical cartographer
 5943 Lovi a main-belt asteroid, named after George Lovi
 Lovi Poe (born 1989), a Filipino actress and model

See also
 Lovie (name)
 Lovin (surname)
 Lovis (name)
 Lovisa (given name)

 Lavi (disambiguation)
 Levi (disambiguation)